Estêvão Gonçalves Neto (d. 29 July 1627) was a Portuguese priest who became a notable illuminator and miniature artist. His work has been compared to that of Federico Barocci and Taddeo Zuccari.

Early life 
Little information is available about his early life and familial background. Historians speculate that he could be a descendant of Lord of Alba de Yeltes, who fled to Portugal to escape persecution by Isabella I of Castile due to his support of Joanna la Beltraneja's claim to the throne of Castile.

Career 
He was chaplain to the Bishop of Viseu, João Manuel de Ataíde, who made him a canon of his cathedral on 8 October 1622, following the death of canon Cristóvão de Mesquita.

His masterpiece, a profusely illustrated Roman Pontifical made from 1616 to 1622 is part of the collection of the Lisbon Academy of Sciences. It is regarded as one of the best examples of Portuguese illumination.

References

1627 deaths
17th-century Portuguese artists
Canons (priests)
Portuguese abbots
Portuguese Roman Catholic priests